The Aragonese language has many local varieties, which can be grouped by valley or larger comarca areas. The area where Aragonese is spoken has quite a rugged relief and is generally sparsely populated with many tracts and valleys pretty isolated from each other. In the literature about the language, the term dialect is ambiguous and can be used to refer to well-known valley varieties, such as cheso or ansotano. Aragonese speakers can be classified into four groups or main dialectal areas following Francho Nagore: Western, Central, Eastern, and Southern. There is a multisecular diglossia that has favored the lack of unitary awareness among Aragonese speakers; in areas where the language has been best preserved, Aragonese speakers often use local names for their dialect.

Classification proposals

The Four Dialects 
The most accepted dialectal classification is the one by Francho Nagore, who classified Aragonese varieties into 4 groups: 

 Western Aragonese
 Central Aragonese
 Eastern Aragonese
 Southern Aragonese

For some, these groups are considered complex dialects and their internal variations, such as Cheso or Chistabino, would be regional variants. For others, the four groups are the constituent dialects of the Aragonese language and the variants that they include would be subdialects, spoken locally or regionally.

Others 
Although the Nagore classification with four dialectal areas is the most widespread, other authors have proposed alternatives. For Chusé Raúl Usón and Chabier Tomás, there would be three historical dialects that correspond more or less to the three old Pyrenean counties: 

 Western Dialect: County of Aragón
 Central Dialect: County of Sobrarbe
 Eastern Dialect: County of Ribagorza

Fernando Sánchez proposed a classification that posits the existence of two great variants/dialects: Western and Eastern. These would also have more extreme subvarieties: 

 Within the Western dialect: Ansotano (and in some ways, Cheso and Ayerbense), with extreme Western characteristics, related to the ancient Navarrese romance.
 Within the Eastern dialect: Ribagorzano, with many traits close to Catalan.

Eastern Aragonese

The eastern area includes a large part of the historic County of Ribagorza, plus eastern parts of Sobrarbe, and has many features in common with Catalan, with increasing similarity as one moves east.

Some common features of the group are:

 Latin plosive consonants become voiced between vowels: meligo (navel), caixigo (type of oak), forau (hole). 
 In participles, the voiced Latin -T- was later deleted, giving endings in -au, -iu: cantau, metiu (sung, put in). 
 There is a periphrastic past perfect as in modern Catalan: él/ell ba cantá/cantar (he sang). 
 Conservation of the adverbial pronoun i (< IBI).
 Compared to the other dialects, more cases of evolution of the Latin endings -TY, -CE, -CI, -DE to -u, as in Catalan: peu (foot).

Western Aragonese

The Western Aragonese area corresponds to the Jacetania region, plus part of Alto Gállego and a few towns in Cinco Villas. Western dialects include Ansó Aragonese, Hecho Aragonese, Aragüés Aragonese, and Aísa Aragonese.

Common features:
 Latin plosive consonants are voiced between vowels, but with exceptions, such as gramito or espata. These exceptions might be related to the Gascon dialect. 
 Participles, have endings in -au, -iu. 
 The 1st and 2nd person plural pronouns are nos and bos.
 Dative pronouns: li, lis.
 Adverbial pronoun bi (< IBI), equivalent to French y, Catalan hi, etc.

Southern Aragonese

Southern dialects include Nevalese. They are the ones more influenced by the Spanish language, and in recent times most of them have lost all but a few of their Aragonese features, merging with the Spanish dialects spoken to the south of the area.

Central Aragonese

Corresponds to part of Alto Gállego and western parts of Sobrarbe. Features:

 Some instances of -ia- diphthong from Latin short E: fiasta (celebration).
 Latin intervocalic stops remain voiceless much more often than in other dialects: capeza (head), saper (to know), lupo (wolf), ayutar (to help).
 This conservation of voiceless stops leads to participles in -ato, -ito. 
 Voicing of voiceless stops after liquid consonant: -MP- > -mb-; -NT- > -nd-; -NK- > -ng-; -LT- > -ld-; -RT- > -rd-; -LP- > -lb-; -RK- > -rg-. These rules apply variably for different words and towns.
 In some towns, definite articles ro, ra, ros, ras instead of the general Aragonese o, a, os, as.

Current Classification of Regional Dialects 
Western Block:
 Ansotano from Ansó Valley
 Cheso from Hecho Valley
 Aragüesino from Aragüés and Jasa
 Aisino from Aísa Valley
 Jaqués from Jaca

Central Block:
 Central Western Aragonese
 Tensino from Tena Valley
 Panticuto from Panticosa
 Biescas land Aragonese
 Acumuer Valley Aragonese
 Serrablés from Serrablo
 Ballibasa Aragonese from Yebra de Basa 
 Sobrepuerto Aragonese
 Central Eastern Aragonese
 Fiscal Aragonese
 Bergotés from Broto Valley
 Vió Valley Aragonese
 Puértolas Valley Aragonese
 Tella Valley Aragonese
 Belsetano from Bielsa
 Sierra Ferrera Aragonese

Eastern Block:
 Chistabino from Gistau Valley
 Fovano from La Fueva Valley
 Ribagorzano Aragonese from the old County of Ribagorza
 Altorribagorzano or Benasqués or Patués from Benasque Valley
 Mediorribagorzano or Campo dialect
 Bajorribagorzano
 Grausino from Graus
 Estadillano frpm Estadilla
 Foncense from Fonz

Southern Block:
 Ayerbense from Ayerbe
 Somontanés Aragonese from Somontano
 Navalés from Naval
 Aragonese from Old Sobrarbe

Transition Dialects
 Aragonese Spanish

Valleys and Somontano 
There are different degrees of similarities between variants:

Axial Pyrenees Valleys 
The topography in the form of well-separated valleys has caused the Aragonese language to have evolved into a dialect or locally spoken language in each valley:

Western and Eastern Poles 
There is a distribution of differences between the East and the West, with boundaries that do not coincide, but some that appear mainly from Broto and Cotefablo to the Ribagorza and further, and others that are seen mainly from Tena and Cotefablo to Navarre.

References

See also
Judaeo-Aragonese

 
Aragonese